WJIH-LP 95.9 FM is a radio station licensed to Oneonta, New York.  The station broadcasts a Christian radio format and is owned by Spirit and Truth Christian Assembly.

References

External links
WJIH-LP's official website
 

JIH
JIH